The comparison of mail servers covers mail transfer agents (MTAs), mail delivery agents, and other computer software that provide e-mail services.

Unix-based mail servers are built using a number of components because a Unix-style environment is, by default, a toolbox operating system. A stock Unix-like server already has internal mail; more traditional ones also come with a full MTA already part of the standard installation.  To allow the server to send external emails, an MTA such as Sendmail, Postfix, or Exim is required. Mail is read either through direct access (shell login) or mailbox protocols like POP and IMAP. Unix-based MTA software largely acts to enhance or replace the respective system's native MTA.

Microsoft Windows servers do not natively implement e-mail, thus Windows-based MTAs have to supply all the necessary aspects of e-mail-related functionality.

Feature comparison

Authentication

Antispam features

See also 
 Comparison of email clients
List of email archive software
List of mail server software

References 

Message transfer agents
Mail servers